The  opened in Hakodate, Hokkaidō, Japan in 1993. It exhibits materials relating to Ishikawa Takuboku and other contributors to the Hakodate literary scene.

The building in which the museum is housed was constructed in 1921 as the Hakodate Branch of the Dai-ichi Bank. After the bank moved premises in 1964, the building was taken over by the JACCS company (ja), which donated it to the city in November 1989, to be used for the promotion of culture.

See also
 Hakodate City Museum of Northern Peoples
 Hakodate City Museum

References

External links

 Hakodate City Museum of Literature 

Museums in Hakodate
Literary museums in Japan
1993 establishments in Japan
Museums established in 1993